Martin Joseph McDonald (born 4 December 1973) is a Scottish former professional footballer who played as a midfielder for various teams in the Football League. He was born in Irvine, Scotland.

External links

1973 births
Living people
Scottish footballers
Association football midfielders
Stockport County F.C. players
Southport F.C. players
Doncaster Rovers F.C. players
Macclesfield Town F.C. players
Altrincham F.C. players
Mossley A.F.C. players
Hyde United F.C. players
Flixton F.C. players
Salford City F.C. players
Droylsden F.C. players
Cheadle Town F.C. players
Leek Town F.C. players
Kidsgrove Athletic F.C. players
Witton Albion F.C. players
English Football League players
New Mills A.F.C. players